Rangoni is a surname. Notable people with the surname include:

Beatrice Rangoni Machiavelli (born 1936), Italian politician, author, and activist
Luca Rangoni (born 1968), Italian auto racing driver
Ercole Rangoni (died 1527), Italian Catholic Cardinal

Italian-language surnames